Jan Gürtler (born 6 February 1970) is a German para table tennis player who competes in international level events. He is a World silver medalist, a double European champion and three-time Paralympic medalist in team events.

References

External links
 
 

1970 births
Living people
Sportspeople from Halle (Saale)
Sportspeople from Berlin
Paralympic table tennis players of Germany
Table tennis players at the 1992 Summer Paralympics
Table tennis players at the 1996 Summer Paralympics
Table tennis players at the 2000 Summer Paralympics
Table tennis players at the 2004 Summer Paralympics
Table tennis players at the 2008 Summer Paralympics
Table tennis players at the 2012 Summer Paralympics
Table tennis players at the 2016 Summer Paralympics
Medalists at the 1992 Summer Paralympics
Medalists at the 1996 Summer Paralympics
Medalists at the 2012 Summer Paralympics
German male table tennis players